Longues-sur-Mer is a commune in the Calvados department in Normandie region in northwestern France.

The Longues-sur-Mer battery is nearby, part of the Atlantic Wall coastal fortifications.

Population

See also
Communes of the Calvados department
Longues Abbey

References

External links

 The battery at Longues-sur-Mer
 Photos of Longues sur Mer battery

Communes of Calvados (department)
Calvados communes articles needing translation from French Wikipedia
Populated coastal places in France